Renato Cinquegranella (born 15 May 1949) is an Italian criminal and a member of the Camorra. Cinquegranella is on the "List of most wanted fugitives in Italy" of the ministry of the Interior.

Biography 
Renato Cinquegranella was born in Naples. In the 1980s he was linked to the Nuova Famiglia and according to investigators, he was involved in the murder of Giacomo Frattini, known as 'Bambulella', a young affiliate of the Nuova Camorra Organizzata of Raffaele Cutolo. Frattini was tortured, killed and torn to pieces in January 1982, to avenge the murder in prison of a loyalist of the then Secondigliano's flamboyant boss, Aniello La Monica. Bambulella was found wrapped in a sheet in the trunk of a car with a disfigured face, while his hands and heart were found closed in two plastic bags inside the car. In May 2014 was confirmed the life sentence for Cinquegranella and other Camorristi for the crime.

In the 1980s, Cinquegranella was also accused of giving refuge in his villa in Castel Volturno to terrorists belonging to the Red Brigades.

Fugitive 
Since 2002 Cinquegranella is wanted for mafia-type criminal association, murder, illegal possession of weapons and extortion.

From 7 December 2018 international research has been issued, and arrest for the purpose of extradition.

Since 2019, Renato Cinquegranella is the most wanted fugitive belonging to the Camorra.

See also
List of fugitives from justice who disappeared
List of most wanted fugitives in Italy
Camorra

References

External links
 List of most wanted fugitives in Italy 

1949 births
Camorristi
Fugitives wanted by Italy
Fugitives wanted on organised crime charges
Living people
Criminals from Naples